Joseph Draper (December 25, 1794 – June 10, 1834) was a U.S. Representative from Virginia.

Early life and education
Born in Draper Valley, Wythe (now Pulaski) County, Virginia, Draper attended private schools.
He studied law.
He was admitted to the bar in 1818 and commenced practice in Wytheville, Virginia.
He served as a private in the War of 1812.
He served as member of the Senate of Virginia during the period 1828–1830.

Tenure in Congress
Draper was elected as a Jacksonian to the Twenty-first Congress to fill the vacancy caused by the death of Alexander Smyth and served from December 6, 1830, to March 3, 1831.
He unsuccessfully contested the election of Charles C. Johnston to the Twenty-second Congress.

Draper was subsequently elected to the Twenty-second Congress to fill the vacancy caused by the death of Charles C. Johnston and served from December 6, 1832, to March 3, 1833.
He was not a candidate for renomination.

Later life and death
He resumed the practice of law until his death in Wytheville, Virginia, June 10, 1834.
He was interred in a private cemetery known as Oglesbies Cemetery, Drapers Valley, Virginia.

Sources

1794 births
1834 deaths
Virginia lawyers
Virginia state senators
American military personnel of the War of 1812
Jacksonian members of the United States House of Representatives from Virginia
19th-century American politicians
19th-century American lawyers
People from Pulaski County, Virginia